Archduke Joseph Franz Leopold of Austria (9 April 1799 – 30 June 1807) was the second son and seventh child of Francis II, the last Holy Roman Emperor and his second wife, Maria Theresa of Naples and Sicily, daughter of Ferdinand I of the Two Sicilies and his wife Maria Carolina of Austria. He was their fourth child to die.

Biography

Archduke Joseph Franz was born at the Hofburg Imperial Palace, where all of his siblings were born. Joseph's mother Maria Theresa died after giving birth to a short-lived daughter, Amalie, in 1807.

He was a lively child and one of the favourite children of his mother and possibly even his father.

On 30 June 1807, just one month after the passing of his mother, the 8 year-old Archduke died at the Hofburg Palace of either yellow fever or smallpox, though yellow fever seems to be the most acceptable, as the outbreak was in the United States in 1803 and most of the American plagues extended to Europe in a matter of 2–4 years.

Joseph Franz was buried at the Capuchin Church in Vienna, more specifically in the Imperial Crypt (his heart is buried in the Herzgruft chamber), the burial place of his family.

Ancestry

References

thePeerage.com

1799 births
1807 deaths
House of Habsburg-Lorraine
18th-century Austrian people
19th-century Austrian people
Austrian Roman Catholics
Modenese princes
Deaths from yellow fever
Austrian princes
Burials at the Imperial Crypt
Burials at St. Stephen's Cathedral, Vienna
Sons of emperors
Royalty and nobility who died as children
Children of Francis II, Holy Roman Emperor
Sons of kings